William Thomas Emmanuel  (born 31 May 1955) is an Australian guitarist. Regarded as one of the greatest acoustic guitarists of all time, he is known for his complex fingerstyle technique, energetic performances and use of percussive effects on the instrument. Originally a session player in many bands, Emmanuel carved out his own style as a solo artist, releasing many award-winning albums and singles. In June 2010 Emmanuel was appointed a Member of the Order of Australia (AM), and in 2011 he was inducted into the Australian Roll of Renown.

Life and career
One of six children, Emmanuel was born in Muswellbrook, New South Wales, Australia, in 1955. He received his first guitar in 1959 at age four and was taught by his mother to accompany her playing lap steel guitar. In 1961, at the age of six, he heard Chet Atkins playing on the radio. He vividly remembers that moment and said it greatly inspired him as a musician.

By the age of six, he was a working professional musician. Recognizing the musical talents of Emmanuel and his older brother, Phil, their father created a family band, sold their home, and took his family on the road. With the family living in two station wagons, much of Emmanuel's childhood was spent touring Australia, playing rhythm guitar, and rarely going to school. After their father died in 1966, Australian Country Music star Buddy Williams approached the family and asked permission to take the Emmanuel brothers on the road with his touring show travelling around Australia. Tommy Emmanuel would go on to record a number of Buddy Williams albums in the early 1970s. Eventually, the New South Wales Department of Education insisted that the Emmanuel children had to go to school regularly.

The Emmanuels eventually settled in Parkes. Tommy Emmanuel eventually moved to Sydney, where he was noticed nationally when he won a string of talent contests in his teen years. By the late 1970s, he was playing drums with his brother Phil in the group Goldrush as well as doing session work on numerous albums and jingles. He gained further prominence in the late 1970s as the lead guitarist in the Southern Star Band, the backing group for vocalist Doug Parkinson. During 1986–1988 and 1995, he joined the lineup of the leading New Zealand/Australian 1970s rock group Dragon that had reformed in 1982, touring widely with them, including a 1987 tour with Tina Turner; he left the group to embark on a solo career.

In 1994, Australian music veteran John Farnham invited him to play the guitar next to Stuart Fraser from Noiseworks for the Concert for Rwanda. Emmanuel had previously been a member of Farnham's band during the early 1980s and featured on the album Uncovered and rejoined after the 1994 concert.

In July 1999, Chet Atkins commented that Emmanuel was a "fearless" fingerpicking guitar player and awarded Tommy and four others (John Knowles, Marcel Dadi, Jerry Reed, and Steve Wariner) the "Certified Guitar Player" title.

Emmanuel and his brother Phil performed live in Sydney at the closing ceremony of the Summer Olympics in 2000. The event was televised worldwide with an estimated 2.85 billion viewers.

In December 2007, he was diagnosed with heart problems and was forced to take a break from his hectic touring schedule due to exhaustion but returned to full-time touring in early 2008. In 2009 he worked with fellow local artists Ray Burgess, Marty Rhone, John St Peeters and John "Swanee" Swan to release a single, "Legends of the Southern Land".

In June 2010, Emmanuel was appointed a Member of the Order of Australia (AM).

At the 2011 ‘TommyFest’, Tommy took the chance to talk to the audience about his strong Christian faith.
“The Lord is my shepherd, so I lack nothing—it’s true!” he told the gathered crowds.

In 2012, Governor Steve Beshear awarded Emmanuel the state of Kentucky's honorific title of Kentucky Colonel.

During a July 2019 concert he mentioned recently receiving American citizenship.

Guitar style

Emmanuel had said that even at a young age he was fascinated by Chet Atkins's musical style (sometimes referred to as Travis picking) of playing bass lines, chords, melodies, and harmonies simultaneously using the thumb and fingers of the right hand, achieving a dynamic range of sound from the instrument. Although Emmanuel's playing incorporates a multitude of musical influences and styles, including jazz, blues, bluegrass, folk and rock, this type of country finger-style playing is at the core of his technique. While Emmanuel has never had formal music training and does not read or write music, his natural musical ability, intrinsic sense of rhythm, and charisma gained him fans from all over the world. As a solo performer, he never plays to a setlist and uses a minimum of effects onstage. He usually completes studio recordings in one take.

In his solo shows, he mainly plays guitars made by Maton, an Australian guitar manufacturer. He usually travels with two custom Maton EBG808 TE models and one TE1 model, both of which are Tommy Emmanuel artist signature models. He has played Maton guitars for most of his career and is somewhat of an ambassador for the company due to his long-standing association with the brand. Emmanuel is known for the battered and worn-down appearances of his guitars; a result of his dynamic, energetic playing and percussive techniques. One of his signature performances, for example, involves striking the whole body of the guitar in various places with his hands or a drummer's snare-drum brush to emulate the sound of a percussion kit.

Emmanuel usually keeps one Maton EBG808 in standard guitar tuning (E-A-D-G-B-E), while he tunes his second Maton EBG808 to D-G-D-G-B-E (G6 tuning) and his TE1 to C-F-B-E-G-C.  He generally uses 0.12 gauge (light) strings on one EBG808 and 0.13 gauge (medium) strings on the second Maton EBG808 and on the TE1. This allows him to quickly change tuning by swapping between guitars during a show if needed, rather than spending time onstage re-tuning one guitar.

Emmanuel often curls his left thumb around the neck of the guitar onto the fretboard to play some notes, rather than using only his fingers to play — contrary to how classical guitarists play, but not unusual for jazz and country guitarists. He frequently plays common three-finger chord shapes with just two fingers. He commonly uses a thumbpick, a flat pick (plectrum), his fingers, or a combination of these in his playing, a style known as hybrid picking. Amongst his trademark rapid virtuoso licks and cascading harmonic progressions, he often uses a technique that imitated an electric guitar's tremolo system on acoustic guitar — by pressing the palm of his right hand against the sound board of the guitar near the neck joint, while maintaining forward pressure with his left hand on the top of the headstock. The guitar neck slightly bends away from the body and consequently affects the pitch of the strings to achieve the desired sound.

Influences
As a young man in Australia, Emmanuel wrote to his hero Chet Atkins in Nashville, Tennessee. Eventually, Atkins replied with words of encouragement and a long-standing invitation to drop by to visit.

In 1997, Emmanuel and Atkins recorded as a duo, releasing the album The Day Finger Pickers Took Over the World. It would be Atkins's last album, with the exception of "Solo Sessions" which Atkins' estate released posthumously. Emmanuel and Atkins appeared together on The Nashville Network's 'Country Christmas' in late 1997, and on that occasion, Atkins stated about him: "He is one of the greatest guitar players I've ever seen." Atkins gave Emmanuel the guitar on which Arthur "Guitar Boogie" Smith recorded "Guitar Boogie", one of the foundation performances of the blues guitar world and a regular feature of Emmanuel's shows.

In July 1999, at the 15th Annual Chet Atkins Appreciation Society Convention, Atkins presented Emmanuel with a Certified Guitar Player award, an honour Chet personally bestowed to only four guitarists. This award gains its fame from being bestowed by Atkins himself, a widely recognized leader in guitar music. The award states: "In Recognition of His Contributions to the Art of Fingerpicking." Tommy performed at the Chet Atkins Appreciation Society (CAAS) in July each year in Nashville.

In addition to being influenced by Chet Atkins, Emmanuel has stated that he and his brother Phil Emmanuel were inspired by and modelled themselves on Hank Marvin and Bruce Welch of the Shadows.

Discography

 From Out of Nowhere (1979)
 Up from Down Under (1987)
 Dare to Be Different (1990)
 Determination (1991)
 The Journey (1993)
 Terra Firma (1994)
 Classical Gas (1995)
 Initiation (1995)
 Can't Get Enough (1996)
 Midnight Drive (1997)
 Collaboration (1998)
 Only (2000)
 Endless Road (2004)
 Live One (2005)
 The Mystery (2006)
 Happy Hour (2006)
 Center Stage (2008)
 Little by Little (2010)
 All I Want for Christmas (2011)
 Tommy Emmanuel & Friends Live from the Balboa Theatre (2011)
 The Colonel and the Goveror (2013)
 It's Never Too Late (2015)
 Christmas Memories (2016)
 Live at the Ryman (2017)
 Pickin (2017)
 Accomplice One (2018)
 Heart Songs (2019)
 Live! Christmas Time (=2020)
 Live from the Balboa Theatre  (2021)
 ''Imagine LP (2021)

Awards

APRA Awards
The APRA Awards (Australia) are annual awards to recognise composing and songwriting skills, sales, and airplay performance by its members annually.

ARIA Awards
The Australian Recording Industry Association Music Awards, commonly known as ARIA Music Awards, are held to recognise excellence and innovation and achievement across all genres of Australian music. Award nominees and winners, excluding for sales and public voted categories, are selected by the ARIA Academy comprising "judges from all sectors of the music industry - retail, radio and tv, journalists and critics, television presenters, concert promoters, agents, ARIA member record companies and past ARIA winners". The inaugural ARIA Awards took place in 1987.

Australian Roll of Renown
The Australian Roll of Renown honours Australian and New Zealand musicians who have shaped the music industry by making a significant and lasting contribution to Country Music. It was inaugurated in 1976 and the inductee is announced at the Country Music Awards of Australia in Tamworth in January.

|-
| 2011
| Tommy Emmanuel
| Australian Roll of Renown
|

Country Music Awards of Australia
The Country Music Awards of Australia (CMAA) (also known as the Golden Guitar Awards) is an annual awards night held in January during the Tamworth Country Music Festival, celebrating recording excellence in the Australian country music industry. They have been held annually since 1973.

Grammy Awards
The Grammy Awards is an annual award presentation by The Recording Academy to recognize achievement in the mainly English-language music industry.

Mo Awards
The Australian Entertainment Mo Awards (commonly known informally as the Mo Awards), were annual Australian entertainment industry awards. They recognise achievements in live entertainment in Australia from 1975 to 2016. Tommy Emmanuel won two awards in that time.
 (wins only)
|-
| 1994
| Tommy Emmanuel
| Australian Performer of the Year 
| 
|-
| 1996
| Tommy Emmanuel
| Australian Performer of the Year 
| 
|-

National Live Music Awards
The National Live Music Awards (NLMAs) are a broad recognition of Australia's diverse live industry, celebrating the success of the Australian live scene. The awards commenced in 2016.

|-
| National Live Music Awards of 2019
| Rosie Fitzgerald (I Know Leopard)
| Live Guitarist of the Year
| 
|-

Bibliography

Contributor

References

External links

 Official site 
 Interview at NAMM Oral History Library (2017)
 Biography at AllMusic
 Discography at Discogs

1955 births
Living people
Musicians from New South Wales
People from the Hunter Region
20th-century Australian musicians
21st-century Australian musicians
Acoustic guitarists
ARIA Award winners
Australian Christians
Australian country singer-songwriters
Australian jazz guitarists
Australian rock guitarists
Dragon (band)
Fingerstyle guitarists
Members of the Order of Australia
Favored Nations artists